Scent-imental over You is a 1947 Warner Bros. Looney Tunes cartoon directed by Chuck Jones. The short was released on March 8, 1947, and stars Pepé Le Pew.

Plot
A small Mexican hairless dog, wanting to be friends with the other dogs on Park Avenue, decides to borrow a fur coat and enter the dog show. Unfortunately, she borrows a skunk pelt by accident and frightens the other dogs. As she cries her hurt feelings out, she attracts the unwanted attentions of the amorous Pepé Le Pew. After he corners her in a treehouse, she finally removes the pelt and Pepé reveals he's wearing a mask, showing that he's a dog and the two embrace. Another mask removal proves Pepé is indeed a skunk who doesn't care that his love interest is a dog.

Home media
 Laserdisc- The Golden Age of Looney Tunes Vol 2
 DVD- Looney Tunes Super Stars' Pepe Le Pew: Zee Best of Zee Best

References

External links

1947 films
1947 animated films
1947 short films
Short films directed by Chuck Jones
Looney Tunes shorts
Warner Bros. Cartoons animated short films
Films scored by Carl Stalling
Animated films about dogs
Pepé Le Pew films
Animated films set in Manhattan
1940s Warner Bros. animated short films
Films with screenplays by Michael Maltese